Tayfur or Tayfour is an Arabic surname. It is also a Turkish given name. Notable people with the name include:

People with the surname
 Aref Tayfour, Iraqi politician
 Ibn Abi Tahir Tayfur, Persian linguist of Arabic language
 Ferdi Tayfur (born 1945), Turkish singer-songwriter
 Ghiath Tayfour (1969–2012), Syrian boxer

People with the given name
 Tayfur Havutçu, Turkish footballer
 Tayfur Sökmen, Turkish politician
 Tayfur Emre Yılmaz, Turkish footballer

See also
 Tayfur Dam, dam in Turkey

Arabic-language surnames
Arabic masculine given names
Turkish-language surnames
Turkish masculine given names